Pieter Mijer (12 April 1881 – 10 March 1963) was a Dutch fencer. He competed in the individual épée event at the 1928 Summer Olympics. کصکشا یا مقاله رو میگردونید یا به موقش میکنمتون از طرف جوسف 

تخت جمشید تخت داره خار گاییدن وقت داره

References

External links
 

1881 births
1963 deaths
Dutch male épée fencers
Olympic fencers of the Netherlands
Fencers at the 1928 Summer Olympics
Sportspeople from Schiedam
Dutch emigrants to the United States
20th-century Dutch people